Victorio Maximiliano "Maxi" Pereira Páez (born 8 June 1984) is a Uruguayan professional footballer who plays as a right-back for Club Atlético River Plate (Montevideo).

He played with Defensor in Uruguay, joining Benfica in 2007 and going on to remain with the club for eight seasons, appearing in 333 official matches and winning 11 major titles. In 2015, he signed with Porto also in Portugal.

A Uruguay international on 125 occasions, Pereira represented the nation in three World Cups and four Copa América, winning the 2011 edition of the latter tournament.

Club career

Defensor
Born in Montevideo, Pereira was known by the nickname "Mono" (Monkey) in his homeland. He started playing professionally with Defensor Sporting as an 18-year-old, early in the 2002–03 season. He took no time to adjust to the first team, being a crucial part alongside Álvaro González and scoring a career-best 12 goals in the Primera División of 2005–06.

After the 2006–07 campaign, Defensor lost both gems as González was transferred to Boca Juniors and Pereira went to S.L. Benfica, accompanied by countryman Cristian Rodríguez; the Primeira Liga club signed the player for €3 million and 70% of his rights.

Benfica

In his first year in Portugal, Pereira was initially played as a right midfielder, failing to adjust to that position. He did score in two consecutive home games in November 2007, in a 6–1 league thrashing of Boavista F.C. and in the group stage of the UEFA Champions League 1–1 draw against A.C. Milan, with his left foot from outside the box.

Pereira switched to right-back the following campaign after Nélson Marcos moved to Real Betis, and became an everpresent fixture. In 2009–10, as Benfica won the league after five years – adding the Taça da Liga – he appeared in 40 competitive matches, scoring five goals in 2,932 minutes of action.

On 17 December 2011, Pereira renewed his contract until 2015 and the club paid €2.7 million for the remaining 30% of his rights, still in possession of Defensor. He netted two goals in the 2011–12 Champions League, both coming against FC Zenit Saint Petersburg in the round-of-16 (2–3 away loss, 2–0 home win, both through tap-ins) as his team eventually reached the quarter-finals of the competition, where he was sent off in the first half of the second leg against Chelsea after two bookable offences (1–1 away draw, 1–2 aggregate defeat).

Pereira reached the 300-game milestone at Benfica on 2 October 2014, in a Champions League match against Bayer 04 Leverkusen, becoming the second foreigner behind Luisão to achieve this feat. On 2 May of the following year, he scored twice in a 5–0 rout at Gil Vicente FC, contributing a further three goals as the team renewed their domestic supremacy.

Porto

On 30 June 2015, Pereira left Benfica following the expiration of his contract. Fifteen days later, he joined rivals FC Porto as a replacement for Real Madrid-bound Danilo. His competitive debut occurred on 15 August, in a 3–0 home victory over Vitória S.C. where he provided two assists for teammates Vincent Aboubakar and Silvestre Varela. The following 6 March he scored his first goal for the team, a late equaliser in a 1–3 loss at S.C. Braga.

On 22 May 2016, in the final of the Taça de Portugal, also against Braga, Pereira's attempt in the penalty shootout was saved by José Marafona, in an eventual 2–4 defeat (2–2 after 120 minutes). The following 14 March, in the away leg of the last 16 of the Champions League against Juventus FC, he received a straight red card for handling Gonzalo Higuaín's goal-bound shot, conceding a penalty from which Paulo Dybala scored the only goal to eliminate the Portuguese 3–0 on aggregate.

After playing a part in winning the national championship in the 2017–18 season, Pereira was awarded a new deal of undisclosed length. On 4 August 2018, he scored in the 3–1 win over C.D. Aves in the Supertaça Cândido de Oliveira, and was voted player of the match. 

Pereira's contract expired in June 2019. In November 2020, it was reported that he was training with Porto's farm team Padroense F.C. and had not announced his retirement. In the same month, he sued his former club for an alleged debt of €1.24 million to him.

Peñarol
On 1 February 2021, Pereira returned to his homeland's league for the first time in 14 years, signing for Peñarol on a contract until July, with an option for the remainder of the year. He made his debut on 6 March as a last-minute substitute for Juan Acosta in a 2–0 home win over Club Atlético River Plate. He scored the only goal in the third minute of a victory at C.A. Rentistas on 9 October, as his team went on to win the title.

International career

A Uruguayan international since making his debut on 26 October 2005 in a friendly loss, away against Mexico, Pereira quickly became a regular for his country, and represented it at the 2007 Copa América. He was selected for the squad at the 2010 FIFA World Cup in South Africa, playing all the games and minutes for the eventual semi-finalists. In the quarter-finals against Ghana, he missed his penalty shootout attempt but the side eventually qualified for the next stage, where he scored his first goal as an international in a 2–3 loss against the Netherlands, finding the net in the 91st minute.

Pereira was again an undisputed starter for Uruguay in the 2011 Copa América held in Argentina, with the national team winning their 15th continental tournament. He played 14 times in qualification for the 2014 World Cup, scoring once in a 4–2 victory over Peru on 10 June 2012 and opening the scoring as his team won 5–0 away to Jordan in a play-off to qualify for the tournament, on 13 November of the following year.

Pereira was the first player sent off in the finals in Brazil, receiving his marching orders in injury time of the 1–3 defeat to Costa Rica in Fortaleza after kicking Joel Campbell. He played a further two matches in the tournament, which ended for the Charrúas at the last-16 stage.

On 28 March 2015, Pereira earned his 100th cap in a 1–0 friendly defeat of Morocco in Agadir, becoming only the second Uruguayan after Diego Forlán to reach the milestone. He played every minute of the campaign at that year's Copa América, captaining the team in their final group fixture against Paraguay in place of the suspended Diego Godín. 

On 9 June 2016, Pereira surpassed Forlán as Uruguay's most capped player by earning his 113th in the team's final group game at the Copa América Centenario in the United States; the 1–0 loss to Venezuela eliminated the nation. The 34-year-old was also selected for the 2018 World Cup, but did not leave the bench. He retired in November of that year with 125 caps to his name.

Career statistics

Club

International

International goals
Scores and results list Uruguay's goal tally first, score column indicates score after each Pereira goal.

Honours
Benfica
Primeira Liga: 2009–10, 2013–14, 2014–15
Taça de Portugal: 2013–14
Taça da Liga: 2008–09, 2009–10, 2010–11, 2011–12, 2013–14, 2014–15
Supertaça Cândido de Oliveira: 2014
UEFA Europa League runner-up: 2012–13, 2013–14

Porto
Primeira Liga: 2017–18
Supertaça Cândido de Oliveira: 2018
Taça de Portugal runner-up: 2015–16, 2018–19

Peñarol
Uruguayan Primera División: 2021

Uruguay
Copa América: 2011

Individual
Cosme Damião Awards – Footballer of the Year: 2012

See also
List of footballers with 100 or more caps

References

External links

1984 births
Living people
Uruguayan people of Galician descent
Uruguayan footballers
Footballers from Montevideo
Association football defenders
Association football midfielders
Uruguayan Primera División players
Defensor Sporting players
Peñarol players
Club Atlético River Plate (Montevideo) players
Primeira Liga players
S.L. Benfica footballers
FC Porto players
Uruguay international footballers
2007 Copa América players
2010 FIFA World Cup players
2011 Copa América players
2013 FIFA Confederations Cup players
2014 FIFA World Cup players
2015 Copa América players
2018 FIFA World Cup players
Copa América Centenario players
Copa América-winning players
FIFA Century Club
Uruguayan expatriate footballers
Expatriate footballers in Portugal
Uruguayan expatriate sportspeople in Portugal